Filur is a Danish duo band established in 1999 and made up of producer Tomas Barfod and of Kasper Bjørke (on lead vocals). They also feature many guest artists for their releases. 

Filur has released 4 albums and many successful singles. They are best known for the hit "I Want You", which was the 4th most played Danish work outside of Denmark in 2005. 

They were also popular in Italy where they had charting hits "It's alright" and "Shame" both credited to "Filur meets Miss Nellie Ettison". Both were released in 2001.

The duo has toured extensively in the United States, Europe and Japan and had special album release Peace for the Japanese market. The band has won two DMA awards for "Best Producers" and "Best Dance Album".

Tomas Barfod has been also involved in WhoMadeWho, whereas Kasper Bjørke concentrated on his solo work and for producing other artists.

Discography

Albums

Limited editions
2003: Peace (only released in Japan)

Singles

See also
Kasper Bjørke
WhoMadeWho

References

External links
Discogs page
Filur LastFM page

Danish dance music groups
Danish musical duos
Electronic music duos